The Yser Front (or ), sometimes termed the West Flemish Front in British writing, was a section of the Western Front during World War I held by Belgian troops from October 1914 until 1918. The front ran along the Yser river (IJzer) and Yser Canal (Ieperlee) in the far north-west of Belgium and defended a small strip of the country which remained unoccupied. The front was established following the Battle of the Yser in October 1914, when the Belgian army succeeded in stopping the German advance after months of retreat and remained largely static for the duration of the war.

Background
During the early campaigns of 1914, the Belgian army had been pushed out of the fortified cities of Liège, Namur and Antwerp by the German advance. Although they succeeded in delaying the Germans at some actions, they were forced to withdraw, first to Antwerp, and into the far north-west of Belgium. By October 1914, the Belgian forces were holding a position along the Yser and Ieperlee canal. After months of retreat, the Belgian forces were considerably reduced and were exhausted. They flooded a large expanse of territory in front of their lines, stretching as far south as Diksmuide. Between 16 and 31 October 1914, the Belgians held off the German army at the Battle of the Yser, suffering 3,500 killed and 15,000 wounded.  The Battle of the Yser established a front line which would endure until 1918.

Geography

From Pervijze, the line then arched south-east between the Yser and Ieperlee, down to Oudekapelle and Reninge. Diksmuide had fallen to German forces shortly before the Battle of the Yser.

The front protected a small region of north-west Belgium which remained unoccupied. King Albert I, commander-in-chief of the Belgian Army, established his headquarters in Veurne, one of the salient's only towns. The Belgian government, under Charles de Broqueville, established itself in exile in Sainte-Adresse, a suburb of the nearby French city of Le Havre.

Aspects

Belgian policy and diplomacy

Despite protecting the northern sector of the Western Front, the Belgian army at the Yser refused to participate in Allied offensives for most of the war. King Albert I, in command of the Belgian armed forces, believed that Belgium's neutrality meant that its army should only be used to further Belgium's national interests. Albert was sceptical of the value of offensive warfare, advocated by the British and French, which he believed to be costly and unable to achieve decisive victory. Albert believed that a mediated peace was inevitable and that it served Belgium's national interest to continue to protect the territory it already held until the Germans could be forced to open negotiations. Consequently, the Yser Front remained generally static for much of the war. Only after the failure of the Ludendorff Offensive in 1918 did the Belgian Army participate in an Allied offensive, the Hundred Days Offensive, making successful advances into German-occupied Belgium. 

After the following Battle of Courtrai, the GAF advanced some  more.

Daily life

The front was held uniquely by Belgian forces, which numbered around 221,000 men by September 1918. Throughout the war, the Belgian Army was supplemented by escapees of military age (évadés) from German-occupied Belgium. Altogether, around 20,000 Belgian soldiers died on the Yser during the war. In 1914, the Christmas truce was observed in a number of parts of the line and a few Belgian and German troops met in no-man's land between the trenches.

Life on the front line was poor, with soldiers forced to live and sleep in unsanitary trenches, in mud ploughed up by artillery fire. Typhus was a major problem among Belgian troops on the Yser Front, where up to 7,000 soldiers died from diseases contracted there.

Politics and the Flemish Movement
Within the Belgian army, the experience of the Yser Front had led to political upheaval. Of the Belgian soldiers on the Yser, between 65 and 80 percent were Flemish, speaking Dutch, while many of the Walloons spoke dialects such as Gaumais or Walloon. The language of command, however, was French and many Flemish soldiers felt resentful at their treatment by the French-speaking officer class. For the Flemish troops, the disquiet culminated in 1916 with the establishment of the Frontbeweging ("Front Movement") which gained a membership of 5,000 soldiers. Although part of the Flemish Movement, the Frontbeweging called for greater regional autonomy in Belgium, rather than Flemish independence, and the creation of Dutch-speaking regiments. Its most celebrated work was the Open Letter to the Belgian King Albert I, drafted by Adiel Debeuckelaere, in 1917 which aired many of the movement's grievances.

Although the Frontbeweging was unsuccessful in the short term, it succeeded in creating a dedicated political party, the Frontpartij, in post-war Belgium after the German defeat delegitimized many other parts of the Flemish Movement implicated in collaboration with the occupation authorities.

See also

Dodengang - section of preserved Belgian trenches near Diksmuide
IJzertoren - a monument to the soldiers killed on the Yser Front
Brothers Van Raemdonck

References

Bibliography

External links

La vie sur le front de l'Yser at the Musée royal de Mariemont
Stabilisation du front sur l'Yser at Commemorer 14-18
On the Yser Front, 1914 at British Pathé.
 IJzerfront 14-18

Western Front (World War I)
Military history of Belgium during World War I
History of Flanders
History of West Flanders